Train robbery is a type of robbery, in which the goal is to steal money or other valuables being carried aboard trains.

History
Train robberies were more common in the past when trains were slower, and often occurred in the American Old West. Trains carrying payroll shipments were a major target. These shipments would be guarded by an expressman whose duty was to protect the cargo of the "express car".

Bandits would rely on the expressman to open the safe and provide the goods. Without the combination lock information, it was almost impossible to break into the safes. However, the invention of dynamite made it much easier to break into safes and rob the train. If the outlaw was unsatisfied with the goods, unarmed passengers of the train's carriages are held at gunpoint and forced to hand over valuables, usually in the form of jewelry or currency.

Contrary to the method romanticized by Hollywood, outlaws were never known to jump from horseback onto a moving train. Usually, they would either board the train normally and wait for a good time to initiate the heist, or they would stop or derail the train and then begin the holdup.

Famous train robbers include Butch Cassidy, Bill Miner and Jesse James. Jesse James is mistakenly thought to have completed the first successful train robbery in the American West when on July 21, 1873 the James-Younger Gang took US$3,000 from a Rock Island Railroad train after derailing it southwest of the town of Adair, Iowa. However, the first peacetime train robbery in the United States actually occurred on October 6, 1866, when robbers boarded the Ohio & Mississippi train shortly after it left Seymour, Indiana. They broke into one safe and tipped the other off the train before jumping off. The Pinkerton National Detective Agency later traced the crime to the Reno Gang. There was one earlier train robbery in May 1865, but because it was committed by armed guerrillas and occurred shortly after the end of the Civil War, it is not considered to be the first train robbery in the United States.

In 2021, train robberies in Los Angeles resulted in hundreds of discarded packages to be strewn about the tracks. Trains were targeted on a section of tracks that they must slow down on and that are easy to access. Thieves are using boltcutters to cut open the locks on shipping containers and taking the packages inside. Union Pacific estimated that losses were in the millions from all the stolen merchandise.

List of most notable train robbers

Some of the most notable train robbers are:
Butch Cassidy (1866–1908)
Bill Downing (1860–1908)
Buster Edwards (1931–1994)
Brian Field (1934–1979)
The Dalton Gang (1890–1892)
Jesse James (1847–1882)
Frank James (1843–1915)
Elmer McCurdy (1880–1911)
Bill Miner (1847–1913)
Bruce Reynolds (1931–2013)
Charlie Wilson (1932–1990)

Notable robberies
 The Great Western Mail Robbery (1849)
In two robberies on the Bristol and Exeter Railway two passengers climbed from their carriage to the mail van and back. They were discovered at Bridgwater after the second robbery. One was Henry Poole, a former guard on the Great Western Railway, dismissed for misconduct (possibly on suspicion of another robbery); the other was Edward Nightingale, the son of George Nightingale, accused, but acquitted, of robbing the Dover mailcoach in 1826, when two thieves had dressed in identical clothes to gain an alibi for the other. They were transported for 15 years. Henry was sent to Bermuda on the Sir Robert Seppings (ship) in December 1850 whilst Edward was transported to Fremantle on the Sea Park in January 1854. 
 Great Gold Robbery of 1855, United Kingdom – France (1855)
 Union Pacific Big Springs robbery, Nebraska, US (1877)
 Canyon Diablo Train Robbery, Arizona, US (1889)
 Fairbank Train Robbery, Arizona, US (1900)
 Rogów raid, Poland (1906) 
 Bezdany raid, Lithuania (1908)
 Baxter's Curve Train Robbery, Texas, US (1912)
 DeAutremont Brothers,  Jackson County, Oregon, US (1923)
 Newton Gang, Rondout, Illinois, US (1924) – The target was Milwaukee Road's Fast Mail
 Kakori Train Robbery, India (1925)
 B & O Zoot Suit Bandits, W. Virginia, USA (1949)
 Great Train Robbery, United Kingdom (1963)
 Sallins Train Robbery, Ireland (1976)

In fiction

 The Great Train Robbery, film (1903)
 Jesse James, film, (1939), starring Tyrone Power and Henry Fonda
 Whispering Smith, film (1948), starring Alan Ladd
 Rage at Dawn, film (1955), starring Randolph Scott and Forrest Tucker
 Man of the West film (1958), starring Gary Cooper
 O Assalto ao Trem Pagador (1962) a Brazilian film which portrays the Japeri Train Robbery
 Butch Cassidy and the Sundance Kid, film (1969), starring Paul Newman and Robert Redford
 The Wild Bunch, film (1969), starring William Holden
 One More Train to Rob, film (1971), starring George Peppard
 The Train Robbers, film (1973), starring John Wayne
 The Taking of Pelham One Two Three, film (1974), starring Walter Matthau
 The Great Train Robbery, novel (1975)
 The Missouri Breaks, film (1976), starring Jack Nicholson and Marlon Brando
 The First Great Train Robbery, film, (1979), starring Sean Connery
 The Chase, novel by Clive Cussler
 The Grey Fox (1982) Canadian film starring Richard Farnsworth that was filmed on the British Columbia Railway
 Tough Guys (1986) a comedy film about two elderly train robbers, starring Kirk Douglas and Burt Lancaster
 Money Train, film (1995), starring Woody Harrelson and Wesley Snipes
 "The Train Job", an episode of the TV series Firefly that involved a train robbery
 The Assassination of Jesse James by the Coward Robert Ford, film (2007), starring Brad Pitt
 The Taking of Pelham 123, film (2009), starring Denzel Washington and John Travolta
 "Dead Freight", an episode of the TV series Breaking Bad in which methylamine is stolen from a train
 Solo: A Star Wars Story, film (2018)
 Red Dead Redemption 2, video game (2018)
Marighella, Brazilian film by Wagner Moura, with Seu Jorge on the role of Marighella (2021)

References

Notorious train robber nabbed in 1916 – Pantagraph (Bloomington, Illinois newspaper)

 
Robbery
Illegal occupations
Organized crime activity
Western (genre) staples and terminology